The Las Vegas LPGA was a golf tournament on the LPGA Tour from 1990 to 1993. It was played in Las Vegas, Nevada at the Desert Inn Country Club from 1990 to 1992 and the Canyon Gate Country Club in 1993.

Winners
Las Vegas LPGA
1993 Trish Johnson

Las Vegas LPGA International
1992 Dana Lofland

Desert Inn LPGA International
1991 Penny Hammel
1990 Maggie Will

References

Former LPGA Tour events
Golf in Las Vegas
History of women in Nevada
1990s in Nevada